Kanni Paruvathile is a 1979 Indian Tamil-language film directed by B. V. Balaguru, starring K. Bhagyaraj, Rajesh and Vadivukkarasi. The screenplay was written by Bhagyaraj. The film is about an impotent husband (Rajesh) – who got injured by a bull in a village jallikattu event – and his wife (Vadivukarasi). The story revolves around how they deal with the daily pressures of society and another man (Bhagyaraj), who wants to have an extra-marital relationship with the woman.

Plot 

Kannama, an innocent village belle, is in love with Subbiah. Subbiah is an orphan and hence, denied marriage with Kannama by her father. Subbiah's friend Cheenu comes to the village and, with his support, Subbiah abducts Kannama and marries her. After his marriage, Subbiah learns that he is unfit for married life. Kannama and Subbiah keep this a secret and pretend to all that they are leading a happy life. One day, in a weak moment, Kannama almost gives herself to Cheenu, who is a womaniser. He learns of Subbiah's problem and starts torturing Kannama. How does Kannama deal with this problem? Does she leave Subbiah to marry Cheenu? Does she teach Cheenu a lesson? All this is revealed in the latter part of the film.

Cast 
 Rajesh as Subbiah
 K. Bhagyaraj as Cheenu
 Vadivukkarasi as Kannamma
 G. Srinivasan
 Muthubharathi

Soundtrack 
The music was composed by Shankar–Ganesh, while lyrics were written by Pulamaipithan, Nethaji, Poonkuyilan and Muthubharathi.

Reception 
Kousigan of Kalki said the film failed to recreate the magic of producer Rajkannu's previous ventures 16 Vayathinile and Kizhakke Pogum Rail.

References

External links 
 

1970s Tamil-language films
1979 films
Films scored by Shankar–Ganesh
Films with screenplays by K. Bhagyaraj